Bad Manners is a 1997 American comedy drama film directed by Jonathan Kaufer and starring David Strathairn, Bonnie Bedelia and Saul Rubinek.  It is based on a play by David Gilman, who also wrote the screenplay.

Cast
David Strathairn as Wes Westlund
Bonnie Bedelia as Nancy Westlund
Saul Rubinek as Matt Carroll
Caroleen Feeney as Kim Matthews
Julie Harris as Professor Harper
Robin Poley as First Musicologist
Daniel Koch as Second Musicologist
Steve Forbert as Coffeehouse Troubadour

Reception
The film received positive reviews from critics and has an 85% rating on Rotten Tomatoes.

Roger Ebert gave the film three stars.

Owen Gleiberman of Entertainment Weekly gave the film a B.

References

External links
 
 

1997 films
1990s English-language films
American comedy-drama films
American films based on plays
1997 comedy-drama films
Films scored by Ira Newborn
1990s American films